In mathematics, a  topological space is feebly compact if every locally finite cover by nonempty open sets is finite. The concept was introduced by S. Mardeĉić and P. Papić in 1955.

Some facts:

 Every compact space is feebly compact.
 Every feebly compact paracompact space is compact.
 Every feebly compact space is pseudocompact but the converse is not necessarily true.
 For a completely regular Hausdorff space the properties of being feebly compact and pseudocompact are equivalent.
 Any maximal feebly compact space is submaximal.

References

Compactness (mathematics)
Properties of topological spaces